The Front de la Jeunesse (FJ) was a Belgian private militia. It was founded in 1973 by members of one of the so-called NEM-Clubs, situated around the Nouvel Europe Magazine.

History 
A French-Algerian man was killed on December 4, 1980 in Brussels by members of the Front de la jeunesse. This killing provoked a huge anti-racist demonstration in Brussels and Philippe Moureaux, the Justice Minister introduced before the Parliament a project of law against racism, adopted a few months later. 

This was one of arson attacks that the group had carried out, with immigrant facilities being the most frequent target of such attacks.

The organization was disbanded in 1983, when a large portion of its members were convicted for being part of a private militia. Some members of the FJ helped create the neo-Nazi organization Westland New Post in 1981.

References

External sources 
 Front de la jeunesse et Parti des forces nouvelles 

Paramilitary organisations based in Belgium
1973 establishments in Belgium
1980s disestablishments in Belgium
Political controversies in Belgium